Madarini is a true weevil tribe in the subfamily Baridinae.

Genera 

 Acanthomadarus 
 Acythopeus 
 Acythophanes 
 Ampeloglypter 
 Amyctides 
 Anazalinus 
 Angelocentris 
 Anisorrhamphus 
 Antesis 
 Apolpones 
 Aponychius 
 Athesapeuta 
 Barinogyna 
 Barymerus 
 Bromesia 
 Calandromimus 
 Centrinopsimorpha 
 Chalcomadaras 
 Chapatiella 
 Codmius 
 Conoproctus 
 Crassiopus 
 Cropelia 
 Cynethia 
 Degis 
 Dendrobaris 
 Diorycaulus 
 Elasmorhinus 
 Eumycterus 
 Eutoxus 
 Glyptobaris 
 Groatus 
 Hasidus 
 Hulpes 
 Hulpesellus 
 Hustachea 
 Ipsichora 
 Keibaris 
 Lepidomyctides 
 Leptoschoinus 
 Linomadaras 
 Liotheantis 
 Loboderinus 
 Lyterius 
 Madarellus 
 Madaropsis 
 Madarus 
 Manilabaris 
 Megabaris 
 Metanthia 
 Micromadarus 
 Microrhinus 
 Microstrates 
 Mimophilus 
 Mimophobus 
 Myctides 
 Myelantiella 
 Nanoplaxes 
 Neoantesis 
 Neomadarus 
 Notesia 
 Notesiaspis 
 Oberprieleria 
 Onychobaris 
 Orchidophilus 
 Pachytheantis 
 Palistes 
 Paracythopeus 
 Parallelodemas 
 Paramadarus 
 Parapiperis 
 Parasolaria 
 Parisoschoenus 
 Pellobaris 
 Physoproctus 
 Piperis 
 Platyonyx 
 Plaxes 
 Polpones 
 Pseudeutoxus 
 Pseudocholus 
 Pycnotheantis 
 Radamus 
 Rytonia 
 Simocopis 
 Sirabia 
 Solaria 
 Solariopsis 
 Squamispichora 
 Stictobaris 
 Stripenia 
 Theantiella 
 Theantis 
 Theogama 
 Tonesia 
 Tripusidia 
 Tripusus 
 Tropidobaris 
 Zalinas 
 Zena 
 Zyzzyva

References

External links 

Baridinae
Polyphaga tribes